Linda Lee Cooper (born July 19, 1944 in Loma Linda, California) is the maiden name for Linda Tiger, an American platform diver who represented the United States at the 1964 Summer Olympics.

Diving Achievements
 Gold Medal at the 1963 Pan American Games in São Paulo, Brazil
 Fourth place finish at the 1964 Summer Olympics in Tokyo, Japan

Published books
A Touch of Prayer: An illustrated children's book about the loving gift of touch during prayer between a mother and her child.  Written by Linda Tiger.  Illustrated by Tricia Gray.

See also
Diving at the 1963 Pan American Games
Diving at the 1964 Summer Olympics - Women's 10 metre platform
List of passengers on the Mayflower

References
 sports-reference

1944 births
Living people
Olympic divers of the United States
Divers at the 1964 Summer Olympics
People from Loma Linda, California
American female divers
Pan American Games gold medalists for the United States
Pan American Games medalists in diving
Divers at the 1963 Pan American Games
Medalists at the 1963 Pan American Games
21st-century American women